A five by five is the best-possible radio signal report in the modern signal strength and readability report system.

Five by Five may also refer to:

Sports
 Five-by-five (basketball), an individual basketball performance in which a player has five in five categories 
 Professor's Cube, the 5x5x5 version of the Rubik's Cube

Media
 "Five by Five" (Angel), an episode of television series Angel
 Five by Five (band), a 1960s–1970s Arkansas-based band

Music albums
 Five by Five (Pizzicato Five EP)
 Five by Five (The Rolling Stones EP)
 Five by Five (The Verve EP)
 VxV or Five by Five, an album by Wolves at the Gate

Songs
 "Five By Five", by The Dave Clark Five	1970

See also
 "Mr. Five by Five", a 1942 song by Freddie Slack and His Orchestra
 Jimmy Rushing, known as "Mr. Five by Five" and the subject of the above song